= 1965 Greater Anchorage Borough election =

Local election in Alaska

- October 5, 1965

The 1965 Greater Anchorage Borough election was an election for borough offices in Anchorage, Alaska. It was held on October 5, 1965. 8,535 ballots were cast.

In a proposition ("Prop B"), the borough's voters voted overwhelmingly against reclassifying from a second class borough into a first class borough, maintaining the borough classification that they had voted to adopt two years prior.

== Borough Assembly ==
=== Section 2 ===
Section 2 seat on the Borough Assembly
Party	Candidate	Votes	%
Nonpartisan	Paul R. Boniface II	365	56.07
Nonpartisan	Walter E. Jerde (incumbent)	286	43.93
Total votes		651	100

=== Section 5 ===
Section 5 seat on the Borough Assembly
Party	Candidate	Votes	%
Nonpartisan	Donald L. Smith	420	41.58
Nonpartisan	James M. Garrigues	305	30.20
Nonpartisan	Mable H. Crawford (incumbent)	285	28.22
Total votes		1,010	100

== Borough school board ==
An election was held for a three-year term for one of the seats on the borough school board.

Borough school board election
Party	Candidate	Votes	%
Nonpartisan	Richard R. Gay (incumbent)	6,560	53.13
Nonpartisan	Dale Pierson	5,788	46.87
Total votes		12,348	100

== Propositions ==
=== Prop A: areawide dog control ===
Prop A: areawide dog control
Candidate	Votes	%
Yes	5,853	71.04
No	2,386	28.96
Total votes	8,239	100

=== Prop B: reclassification of borough as a first class borough ===
Prop B: reclassification of borough as a first class borough
Candidate	Votes	%
No	2,422	63.29
Yes	1,405	36.71
Total votes	3,827	100

=== Prop C: 11 million dollar school bond issue ===
Prop C: 11 million dollar school bond issue
Candidate	Votes	%
Yes	4,822	74.91
No	1,615	25.09
Total votes	6,437	100

=== Prop D: fire control service area number 1 ===
Prop D: fire control service area number 1
Candidate	Votes	%
Yes	397	78.93
No	106	21.07
Total votes	503	100
